The women's triple jump event at the 2001 European Athletics U23 Championships was held in Amsterdam, Netherlands, at Olympisch Stadion on 14 and 15 July.

Medalists

Results

Final
15 July

Qualifications
14 July
Qualifying 13.60 or 12 best to the Final

Group A

Group B

Participation
According to an unofficial count, 16 athletes from 10 countries participated in the event.

 (1)
 (2)
 (2)
 (1)
 (2)
 (3)
 (2)
 (1)
 (1)
 (1)

References

Triple jump
Triple jump at the European Athletics U23 Championships